Opernball (German for Opera Ball) may refer to:
Der Opernball, an 1898 operetta by Richard Heuberger
Opernball (novel), a 1995 novel by Josef Haslinger
Opernball (film), a 1998 television political thriller by Urs Egger based on Haslinger's novel
Vienna Opera Ball or Wiener Opernball, an annual society event held at the Vienna State Opera (since 1935)
Budapest Opera Ball or Budapester Opernball, an annual charity event at the Budapest Opera (since 1886)
Viennese Opera Ball in New York or Wiener Opernball in New York, a charity event at Waldorf Astoria (since 1956)
Oslo Operaball in Norway. Annual event in Gamle Logen since 1988
The Opera Ball (1931 film) (German title Opernredoute), sometimes called Opernball
Opernball (1939 film), a German musical comedy directed by Géza von Bolváry, an adaptation of the 1898 operetta
Opera Ball (1956 film), an Austrian remake by Ernst Marischka starring Theo Lingen, an adaptation of the 1898 operetta

German words and phrases